Beltring Hundred (older: Byltryng Herred) was a mediaeval hundred located in the southern part of North Frisia in the Danish region of Southern Schleswig, part of the Frisian Uthlande. It encompassed the northern part of the island of Strand, which sank in 1634 during the Burchardi flood. Some of the land of Beltring Hundred survived the flood, however, and became the Hallig of Nordstrandischmoor as well as the site of the modern municipality of Ockholm. Beltring Hundred was one of the so-called Five Hundreds or Strand Hundreds on the island, the others being Edoms Hundred, Pellworm Hundred, Southern Goes Hundred, and Lundenberg Hundred.

The hundred gave its name to Beltringharder Koog, a polder that was constructed in 1987 between the island of Nordstrand and the North Frisian mainland, even though the area of the old district and the area of the polder are not the same.

North Frisia
History of Schleswig-Holstein